
Gmina Mędrzechów is a rural gmina (administrative district) in Dąbrowa County, Lesser Poland Voivodeship, in southern Poland.

Villages
Gmina Mędrzechów contains the villages and settlements of Grądy, Kupienin, Mędrzechów, Odmęt, Wójcina, Wola Mędrzechowska and Wólka Grądzka.

Neighbouring gminas
Gmina Mędrzechów is bordered by the gminas of Bolesław, Dąbrowa Tarnowska, Nowy Korczyn, Olesno, Pacanów and Szczucin.

References
Polish official population figures 2006

Medrzechow
Dąbrowa County